Nusa Laut is the smallest inhabited island in the Lease Islands group east of Ambon, in Indonesia's Maluku province.
It lies just off the south-western corner of Saparua island, separated from it by a deep channel. The island's coasts are fringed by a drying reef.

Nusa Laut's 5,780 inhabitants (as at 2020) live in seven villages - Leinitu, Sila, Nalahia and Ameth in the north of the island, and Titawaai, Abubu and Akoon in the south of the island. They speak the Nusa Laut language, as well as Indonesian and Ambonese Malay.

Nusa Laut has an all-Christian population and has been spared the 1999–2000 riots plaguing the rest of the region. Its villages have many colonial style houses and churches, two of which compete for the title of being the oldest church in Maluku. There is also an old fort - the Dutch East India Company's Fort Beverwijk.

Visitors come to the island for its beaches and to dive off the reefs of Ameth - reputedly one of the best dive spots in the Lease Islands.

References

External links 
Old map of Manipa, Haruku, Saparua and Nusa Laut

Islands of the Maluku Islands
Landforms of Maluku (province)
Islands of Oceania
Populated places in Indonesia
Islands of Indonesia